John Donaldson McCallum (1856-1930) was a Scottish minister who served as Moderator of the General Assembly of the Church of Scotland in 1926.

Life

Born in 1856, at Tarbolton,

He studied divinity at Glasgow University graduating MA in 1881 and BD in 1884.

He was minister of Larkhall from at least 1896 to 1926.

He died in October 1930, aged 74.

Family

He was married to Mary Gordon Donald (d.1954).

References

Clergy from Glasgow
20th-century Ministers of the Church of Scotland
Moderators of the General Assembly of the Church of Scotland
1857 births
1930 deaths